Martin Slavík (born 21 September 1979) is a Czech football goalkeeper currently playing for FK Teplice in the Czech Republic.

References

External links
 
 Guardian Football

1979 births
Living people
Association football goalkeepers
Sportspeople from Nový Jičín
Czech footballers
FK Chmel Blšany players
FK Teplice players